Sir George Herbert Walter, KNH (8 September 1928 – 4 March 2008) was an Antiguan politician of the Progressive Labour Movement and Premier of Antigua and Barbuda from 14 February 1971 to 1 February 1976.

Political career
Born 1928, Walter was the second premier of Antigua and Barbuda, the founder of the Antigua Workers' Union (AWU) and the Progressive Labour Movement (PLM) and a former general-secretary of the Antigua Trades & Labour Union (AT&LU).

Walter won Premiership in the 1971 elections, defeating Vere Bird four years after the colony became a British dependency with domestic autonomy. He advocated full independence for Antigua and Barbuda and opposed a British proposal to make Antigua and Barbuda an island federation. He was defeated in the 1976 elections by Bird.

The PLM headed the government from 1971 to 1976. During his tenure as premier of Antigua and Barbuda, Walter was the representative of All Saints, which was then one constituency.

In all, he had 10 years in government – five as premier and the other five as leader of the opposition.

The Social Security Act, the Labour Code that was copied in every Caribbean territory, the Representation of the People's Act and the founding of the Antigua & Barbuda Development Bank were all the work of his PLM government.

After the 1982 elections, he gave up politics and went back to his cattle farm.

Arrest
After being defeated, Walter was convicted of allegedly selling metal illegally to the Antiguan government. He was imprisoned for three months whilst his rivals came up with a case against him. It was successfully appealed to the West Indies Court of Appeal, which ruled it groundless.

Personal life

He was married to Lady Hyacinth Walter, a former teacher and principal of the Antigua Girls' High School, who contested the All Saints seat in 1980 on behalf of her husband, narrowly losing to then ALP member of Parliament Hilroy Humphreys by nine votes.

They had five children Sharon, Paul, Senator Gregory Walter and Vaughn Walter.

George Walter died on 4 March 2008, aged 79, in St. John's. His cause of death was stated by his younger brother Selvyn to be a heart attack. George Walter had been hospitalised for about a week.

In 2008, he was posthumously made a Knight of the Order of the National Hero (KNH) by his native country Antigua and Barbuda, becoming the country's fifth national hero.

References

1928 births
2008 deaths
Prime Ministers of Antigua and Barbuda
Finance ministers of Antigua and Barbuda
Trade union leaders
Knights Grand Cross of the Order of St Michael and St George
Recipients of the Order of the National Hero (Antigua and Barbuda)
Progressive Labour Movement politicians